Hemistola flavitincta is a moth in the family Geometridae first described by William Warren in . It is found in the Khasi Hills of India.

References

Moths described in 1897
Hemitheini